Gillis Bluff Township is one of ten townships in Butler County, Missouri, USA.  As of the 2010 census, its population was 683.

Geography
It contains one cemetery, Carola.

References

External links
 US-Counties.com
 City-Data.com

Townships in Butler County, Missouri
Townships in Missouri